The 1988 PGA of Japan Tour was the 16th season of the PGA of Japan Tour. The season consisted of 40 official events, all played in Japan.

Schedule
The following table lists official events during the 1988 season.

Money list
The money list was based on prize money won during the season, calculated in Japanese yen.

Notes

References

External links

Japan Golf Tour
PGA of Japan Tour
PGA of Japan Tour